The name Indian lettuce has been used to refer to a number of plants used as leaf vegetables used by Native American or Indian people, including but likely not limited to:

 Lactuca indica
 Claytonia perfoliata
 Claytonia sibirica (candy flower)
 Chenopodium californicum

Leaf vegetables